is a Japanese manga series by Etsuko Mizusawa. It was serialized in Shogakukan's seinen manga magazine Big Comic Spirits between March 2016 and February 2018 and has been collected in two tankōbon volumes. An original net animation adaptation premiered on Production I.G's Anime Beans app on June 8, 2018.

Characters

Media

Manga
Moshi Moshi, Terumi Desu was written and illustrated by Etsuko Mizusawa. The manga began serialization in Shogakukan's Big Comic Spirits magazine in March 2016, and it ended in February 2018. The series was compiled in two tankōbon volumes, released between October 12, 2017, and June 12, 2018.

Anime
An anime adaptation was announced in the 10th issue of Big Comic Spirits on February 5, 2018, later revealed to be an original net animation (ONA). The series premiered on Production I.G's streaming app Anime Beans on June 8, 2018.

References

External links
 

2018 anime ONAs
Anime series based on manga
Production I.G
Romantic comedy anime and manga
Shogakukan manga
Seinen manga